is a double waterfall on the Ōno River in Bungo-ōno, Ōita Prefecture, Japan.

Waterfalls

History
As early as the fifteenth century the falls provided a subject for ink wash painting and they feature in the 1803 . In 1909 a dam was built immediately upstream to provide hydroelectric power; in 1923 the height of the dam was raised to increase capacity. The waterfall was subsequently reduced by rock collapses during flooding. In the 1990s, with the dam itself at risk, reinforcement work was carried out by Kyushu Electric Power Company, as well as ancillary landscaping. In 2007 Chinda Falls was registered as a Place of Scenic Beauty.

Depictions

Sesshū was inspired by the waterfall to paint . Although this work was destroyed in the Great Kantō earthquake, a copy by Kanō Tsunenobu survives at the Kyoto National Museum. As part of the efforts to revitalise the area through promotion of its heritage, in late October each year, at the end of the rice harvest, a Sesshū Festival is staged.

See also

 Registered Monuments of Japan

References

Waterfalls of Japan
Registered Monuments of Japan
Landforms of Ōita Prefecture
Tourist attractions in Ōita Prefecture
Bungo-ōno, Ōita